Christopher Coughlan (1961 – 5 January 2001) was an Irish hurler. At club level he played with Na Piarsaigh and was also a member of the Cork senior hurling team. Coughlan usually lined out as a defender.

Career

Coughlan first played hurling at juvenile and underage levels with the Na Piarsaigh club on Cork's northside. After captaining the club to minor and under-21 championship titles, he subsequently joined the club's senior team and won County Championship titles in 1990, as team captain, and 1995. Coughlan first appeared on the inter-county scene when he captained the Cork minor team to victory over Kilkenny in the 1979 All-Ireland minor hurling final. He progressed onto the Cork under-21 team and, after captaining the team in the first round of the 1982 championship, was dropped from the starting fifteen for the Munster final defeat of Limerick, before later failing to make the matchday panel for the 1982 All-Ireland under-21 final defeat of Galway. Coughlan was also included on the Cork senior hurling team for the National Hurling League. His senior career was hampered due to his emigration to New York.

Death

On 5 January 2002, Coughlan died suddenly after suffering a heart attack after taking part in a over-35 five-a-side soccer tournament in Whitechurch, County Cork.

Honours

Na Piarsaigh
Cork Senior Hurling Championship: 1990 (c), 1995
Cork Under-21 Hurling Championship: 1980, 1981 (c)
Cork Minor Hurling Championship: 1977, 1978 (c)

Cork
All-Ireland Under-21 Hurling Championship: 1982
Munster Under-21 Hurling Championship: 1982
All-Ireland Minor Hurling Championship: 1979 (c)
Munster Minor Hurling Championship: 1979 (c)

References

1961 births
2001 deaths
Na Piarsaigh hurlers
Cork inter-county hurlers